Georgij Kaminski (born 25 January 1960) is a Soviet and Russian pilot. He was the absolute champion in FAI World Glider Aerobatic Championships in 2005, 2007 and 2009. He became world vice-champion of Gliding Aerobatics as a pilot in 2013. Kaminski won multiple world and European championships. He is a master of sports (MSMK), honored coach of Russian team. He is member of the Russian Gliding Aerobatics team.

Biography 
Kaminski finished school #22 in Minsk, and then graduated from “Volchansk specialized school” in 1980. The same year was accepted to “Serpuhovsk aviation club” becoming an instructor pilot. In 1982, he was awarded Master of Sports of the USSR. After a successful performance on the RSFSR championship, he was invited to the USSR national aerobatics team.

From 1987 to 1991, he was coach of USSR national aerobatics team.

From 1993, he was a member of the Russia Glider Aerobatics team. Since 1995, Pasechnik O.V. had been leading Russian Glider Aerobatics team, but after his death, the team was led by Nikituk N.A.

In 2014, Kaminski was elected to be a member of FAI Aerobatics Commission (CIVA).

As of 2014, he was working as pilot instructor on Yak-52s in “Serpuhovsk aviation club”, and was deputy head of “ASK flight training”. As of 2015, Kaminski's total flying hours on various types of aircraft has been 7204 hours, including 600 hours on Swift S-1 aerobatics glider.

Sports Achievements 
2014 – Bronze medalist in the World Aerobatic Glider Championship (WAGAC 2014)

2013 – Silver medalist in the World Aerobatic Glider Championship

2009 – Absolute Champion in the World Aerobatic Glider Championship

2007 – Absolute Champion in the World Aerobatic Glider Championship

2005 – Absolute Champion in the World Aerobatic Glider Championship

1999 – Russia champion in aeroplanes

1997 – Holder of first Cup “To the best Yak planes pilot in Russian championship”

1997 – Champion of the first world aviation games (which were conducted parallel with 1997 world championship)

1997 – Team champion in World Glider Championship in team scoring.

1988 – USSR champion in aeroplanes

1986 – USSR champion in aeroplanes

Titles and awards 
Medal of the Order "For Merit to the Fatherland"

Internationally recognized Master of Sports

Breastplate for “Excellence in Physical Culture and Sports”

Honored coach, Russia

References

External links

Glider pilots
Aerobatic pilots
Russian aviators
Living people
Articles containing video clips
Year of birth missing (living people)